This is a list of Canadian electoral calendars.

1990s: 1990 - 1991 - 1992 - 1993 - 1994 - 1995 - 1996 - 1997 - 1998 - 1999
2000s: 2000 - 2001 - 2002 - 2003 - 2004 - 2005 - 2006 - 2007 - 2008 - 2009
2010s: 2010 - 2011 - 2012 - 2013 - 2014 - 2015 - 2016 - 2017 - 2018 - 2019
2020s: 2020 - 2021 - 2022 - 2023

See also 

List of Canadian incumbents by year
Timeline of Canadian elections
List of years in Canada

 Canadian Electoral Calendar
Years in Canada